Anneliese Bulling (born April 21, 1900, in Ellwürden, Wesermarch (today known as Lower Saxony), died February 9, 2004, in Philadelphia, Pennsylvania), also known as Anneliese Gutkind, was a German–American art historian specializing in Chinese art and architecture.

Life 
Anneliese Bulling came from a wealthy, long-established and well-educated German landowning family. She lived with her father, Henry Bulling (1858–1940), a banker, and her mother, Anna Umbsen (1867–1955). In 1927, she had a short-lived marriage to a farmer that was soon declared invalid. After her failed first marriage, Bulling went off to study Art History and Chinese Studies in Berlin at Friedrich Wilhelm University (now Humboldt University of Berlin) under Erich Haenisch and Brinkmann.

In 1935 she graduated with a degree in Chinese Architecture, and in the same year emigrated to London with her partner, the Jewish architect Erwin Gutkind.

In 1946 she found work as a research scholar at the Universities China Committee and then in 1947 in Cambridge at Newnham College, where she received a PhD, the subject of her dissertation being Representational Art in the Han Period.

Bulling's research focus was Chinese art history, especially architecture and arts and crafts. She developed a theory that the Chinese characters are the result of prehistoric (Neolithic) astronomical calendar symbols.

In 1956, Bulling and Gutkind married and emigrated to the United States for his professorship at the University of Philadelphia.

In 1964 she joined Dr. Stackler's translation project, translating many Chinese books, and in 1966 she was promoted to Research Associate for Chinese Art and Archaeology at Columbia University in New York.

Her husband died in 1968.

Bulling died in 2004 at the age of 103 years. She had left the Oldenburg Municipal Museum an extensive collection of letters of correspondence from 1928–1946 (around 4,200 letters and postcards), was the inspiration for the 2009 book, From Ellwürden to Hampstead. The letters of the Oldenburg emigrant Anneliese Bulling. A contribution to the history of mentalities of the Oldenburg bourgeoisie in the period of National Socialism by Andreas Vonderach.

Publications

Monographs 
 The Chinese architecture of the Han period to the end of the T'ang period. Lyon, 1935
 The Meaning of China's most ancient kind. Leiden, 1952
 The Decoration of Mirrors of the Han Period: A Chronology. Ascona: Artibus Asiae, 1960

Essays 
 Neolithic symbol and the purpose of art in China. In: The Burlington Magazine 82, 1943, pp. 91–101

Literature 
 
 Martin Kern: The emigration of sinologist 1933-1945. For the unwritten history of their losses. In: Helmut Martin, Christiane Hammer (ed.): China Sciences - German developments. History, people, perspectives. Hamburg 1999, pp. 222–242
 Rudolf Hierl: Erwin Anton Gutkind. Dissertation, Marburg 1989

See also
Women in the art history field

References

1900 births
2004 deaths
German art historians
German sinologists
German emigrants to the United States
American women historians
20th-century American historians
German women academics
Women art historians
20th-century American women writers
German women historians
Women orientalists
American art historians
21st-century American women